Teuteberg is a surname of:

 Bernhard Teuteberg, retired South African naval officer, who served as Chief Director
 Hanno Teuteberg, retired Rear Admiral in the South African Navy, formerly serving as the Deputy Chief of the Navy
 Hans Jürgen Teuteberg (1929–2015), German historian
 Linda Teuteberg (Linda Merschin; born 1981), German lawyer and politician (FDP)
 René Teuteberg (1914–2006),  Swiss historian

See also 
Teutenberg